The Roccaverano is an indigenous breed of large domestic goat from the Langhe, in the provinces of Asti and Cuneo, in Piemonte in north-western Italy. It is raised mainly in the Langa Astigiana, mostly within the Comunità montana Langa Astigiana Val Bormida, and is named for the town and comune of Roccaverano in that area. The origins of the breed are unknown.

The Roccaverano is one of the forty-three autochthonous Italian goat breeds of limited distribution for which a herdbook is kept by the Associazione Nazionale della Pastorizia, the Italian national association of sheep- and goat-breeders.

Use

The milk yield of the Roccaverano per lactation of about 240 days is  litres for primiparous,  litres for secondiparous, and  litres for pluriparous, nannies. The milk averages 3.30% fat and 3.05% protein, and is all used to make robiola, either Robiola di Roccaverano, made with a mixture of cow's milk, goat's milk and sheep's milk, which has DOP status; or the pure goat's-milk Robiola di Roccaverano pura caprina.

Kids 30–45 days old and weighing  are slaughtered at Easter time.

References

Goat breeds
Dairy goat breeds
Goat breeds originating in Italy
Ark of Taste foods
Meat goat breeds